Eduardo Scarpetta (13 March 1853 – 12 November 1925) was an Italian actor and playwright from Naples.

Biography 
Although not from a theatrical family, he was on the stage by the age of four and is today best remembered as the creator of a character that became his stage alter-ego: Felice Sciosciammocca, a typical, good-natured Neapolitan. The name "Sciosciammocca" translates from Neapolitan as "breath in mouth"—thus, with "Felice" (Happy) the name conveys something like wide-eyed and perhaps a bit scatter-brained. The character was a break with the traditional portrayal of the Neapolitan streetwise Everyman and, as an implied stereotype, invites comparison to the well-known, darker historical Neapolitan "mask" of Pulcinella. The character appears prominently in Scarpetta's best-known work, Miseria e Nobiltà (Misery and Nobility) from the year 1888. The work is well known, too, as a 1954 film featuring Neapolitan comic Totò as Felice Sciosciammocca; the film also features a young Sophia Loren.

Scarpetta dedicated much of his early activity to translating into Neapolitan the standard Parisian farce comedy of the day, such as Hennequin, Meilhac, Labiche and Feydeau. His own original comedies comprise some 50 works. He was the illegitimate father of actor and playwright Eduardo De Filippo as well as of Eduardo's brother and sister, Peppino and Titina. He was also a mentor to the actor Gennaro Pantalena who appeared as part of his company.

In 2021, director Mario Martone realized a movie based on the last period of Scarpetta's career, titled Qui rido io (Here I'm the one who laughs, after the inscription on Scarpetta's mansion), and it had its world premiere in competition at the 78th Venice International Film Festival; the role was played by Toni Servillo.

Plays 

1875 - 
1876 - 
1876 - 
1876 - 
1876 - 
1877 - 
1879 - 
1879 - 
1879 - 
1880 - 
1880 - 
1880 - 
1880 -  (da Bébé di Alfred Hennequin e Émile de Najac)
1880 -  (from Salvestri)
1880 - 
1880 -  (from Guarino)
1880 - 
1880 -  (from F. Cerlone)
1880 -  (from A. Hennequin and A. Delacour)
1880 - 
1880 - 
1881 -  (from Meilhac and Halévy)
1881 - 
1881 - 
1881 - 
1881 - 
1881 - 
1881 - 
1881 - 
1881 - 
1882 - 
1882 - 
1882 - 
1882 - 
1882 - 
1882 - 
1882 - 
1883 - 
1883 - 
1883 - 
1883 - 
1883 - 
1883 - 
1883 - >br>
1883 - 
1883 - 
1884 - 
1884 - 
1884 - 
1884 - 
1885 - 
1885 - 
1885 -  (from Burani)
1885 -  (from Alexandre Bisson)
1886 - 
1887 - 
1888 - 
1888 -  (from A. Hennequin)
1889 - 
1889 -  (from Henri Meilhac and Albert Millaud)
1889 - 
1890 -  (from Antonio Petito)
1890 - 
1890 - 
1890 - 
1891 - 
1892 - 
1892 - 
1893 - 
1893 - 
1893 - 
1893 - 
1894 -  (from Eraldo Baretti)
1894 - 
1894 - 
1894 - 
1895 - 
1895 - 
1896 - 
1896 - 
1896 - 
1897 - 
1897 - 
1897 - 
1897 - 
1897 - 
1898 - 
1898 - 
1899 - 
1899 - 
1899 - 
1899 - 
1899 - 
1899 - 
1900 - 
1900 - 
1901 - 
1901 - 
1901 - 
1902 - 
1902 - 
1902 - 
1902 - 
1902 - 
1903 - 
1903 - 
1903 - 
1903 - 
1904 - 
1904 - 
1905 - 
1907 - 
1907 - 
1908 - 
1909 - 
1915 - 
1923 - 
1924 -

References

External links 

1853 births
1925 deaths
19th-century Neapolitan people
Italian male stage actors
19th-century Italian dramatists and playwrights
20th-century Italian dramatists and playwrights
19th-century Italian male actors
20th-century Italian male actors